The Mixed 4 × 100 metre freestyle relay competition of the 2018 African Swimming Championships was held on 11 September 2018.

Records
Prior to the competition, the existing world and championship records were as follows.

The following new records were set during this competition.

Results

Heats
The heats were started on 11 September at 12:15.

Final
The final was started on 11 September.

References

4 x 100 metre mixed freestyle relay